The 1941 Dudley by-election was held on 23 July 1941.  The by-election was held due to the death of the incumbent Conservative MP, Dudley Joel. It was won by the Conservative candidate Cyril Lloyd.

References

1941 in England
Politics of Dudley
1941 elections in the United Kingdom
By-elections to the Parliament of the United Kingdom in West Midlands (county) constituencies
By-elections to the Parliament of the United Kingdom in Worcestershire constituencies
20th century in Worcestershire